Ponte de Lima is the oldest vila (chartered town, head of a municipality) in Portugal. It is part of the district of Viana do Castelo. The population in 2011 was 43,498, in an area of 320.25 km2. The town proper has about 2,800 inhabitants.

It is named after the long medieval bridge (ponte) that passes over the Lima river that runs next to the town.

The current Mayor is Victor Mendes, elected by the People's Party (CDS–PP). It is one of the six municipalities in Portugal administered by this party. The municipal holiday is 20 September.

General information

Ponte de Lima is located on the southern bank of the Lima, a small river with sources in Spain.

One of the oldest towns in Portugal (founded on 4 March 1125), it was historically significant as a Roman settlement on the road from Braga to Santiago de Compostela and Lugo, and the first place in Portugal getting a municipal charter. Today, it is a significant stop on the Central Portuguese branch of the Camino de Santiago pilgrimage route.

Every second Monday, it holds one of the largest country markets in Portugal. In the second weekend of September, Ponte de Lima hold the Feiras Novas (the new fairs) for three days since 1826, granted by the Royal Provision of king Peter IV of Portugal.

The attractive rural area around has the largest concentration of baroque manors in Portugal (Aurora, Bertiandos, Brandara, Calheiros, and Pomarchão are among the best known); Some provide tourism accommodation. Ponte de Lima is also known in the region and all across Portugal for its red Vinho Verde wines and its sarrabulho rice.

Climate
Ponte de Lima has Mediterranean Climate

Parishes

Administratively, the municipality is divided into 39 civil parishes (freguesias):

 Anais
 Arca e Ponte de Lima
 Arcos
 Arcozelo
 Ardegão, Freixo e Mato
 Bárrio e Cepões
 Beiral do Lima
 Bertiandos
 Boalhosa
 Brandara
 Cabaços e Fojo Lobal
 Cabração e Moreira do Lima
 Calheiros
 Calvelo
 Correlhã
 Estorãos
 Facha
 Feitosa
 Fontão
 Fornelos e Queijada
 Friastelas
 Gandra
 Gemieira
 Gondufe
 Labruja
 Labrujó, Rendufe e Vilar do Monte
 Navió e Vitorino dos Piães
 Poiares
 Refóios do Lima
 Ribeira
 Sá
 Santa Comba
 Santa Cruz do Lima
 Santa Maria de Rebordões
 Seara
 Serdedelo
 Souto de Rebordões
 Vale do Neiva
 Vitorino das Donas

Notable people 

 António de Araújo e Azevedo (1754–1817) a statesman, author, amateur botanist and 1st Count of Barca.
 Francisco de São Luís (1766–1845) a Cardinal of the Catholic Church, the eighth Patriarch of Lisbon, 1840 to 1845.
 Miguel Pereira Forjaz (1769–1827) a general, War Secretary in the Peninsular War and Count of Feira
 Francisco de Melo da Gama de Araújo e Azevedo (1773 – 1859) a field marshal of the Portuguese Army and governor of Diu in Portuguese India 1821 to 1840.
 José Norton de Matos (1867–1955) a Portuguese general and politician.
 Fernando Pimenta (born 1989) a sprint canoeist, silver medallist at the 2012 Summer Olympics and bronze medallist at the 2020 Summer Olympics  
 Vasco Costa (born 1991) a footballer with over 250 club caps

References

External links

Municipality official website

 
Municipalities of Viana do Castelo District
Towns in Portugal